Santo António is a settlement in the western part of the island of Fogo, Cape Verde, 6 km northeast of the island capital of São Filipe.

See also
List of villages and settlements in Cape Verde

References

Villages and settlements in Fogo, Cape Verde
São Filipe, Cape Verde